The 2016–17 Central Arkansas Bears basketball team represented the University of Central Arkansas during the 2016–17 NCAA Division I men's basketball season. The Bears were led by third-year head coach Russ Pennell and played their home games at the Farris Center in Conway, Arkansas as members of the Southland Conference. They finished the season 8–24, 7–11 in Southland play to finish in a five-way tie for eighth place. They lost in the first round of the Southland tournament to Sam Houston State.

Previous season
The Bears finished the 2015–16 season 7–21, 6–12 in Southland play to finish in a three-way tie for ninth place.  Due to APR penalties, they were not eligible for postseason play, including the Southland tournament.

Roster

Schedule and results

|-
!colspan=9 style=| Exhibition

|-
!colspan=9 style=| Non-Conference regular season

|-
!colspan=9 style=|Southland Conference regular season

|-
!colspan=9 style=| Southland tournament

See also
2016–17 Central Arkansas Sugar Bears basketball team

References

Central Arkansas Bears basketball seasons
Central Arkansas
Central Arkansas Bears basketball
Central Arkansas Bears basketball